Thihariya is a small town in Gampaha District. It is located nearly 9 km away from Gampaha town. Thihariya is in between Nittambuwa and Kalagedihena.

Populated places in Gampaha District